Calypso is a Venezuelan telenovela created by César Miguel Rondón and produced by Venevisión in 1999. This telenovela lasted 80 episodes and was distributed internationally by Venevisión International.

Chiquinquirá Delgado and Luis Fernández star as the protagonists.

Synopsis

Calypso is a picturesque and prosperous Caribbean island that, on the day of San Salvador - patron saint of the island, crowns the queen of the festivities, who this year is a lovely young woman named Maria Margarita, “la Bella” (“the Beautiful”). Everyone calls her that not only because of what is obvious to the eye but also to differentiate her from her older sister, who is equally beautiful and has a similar name: Margarita Luisa, “la Grande” (“the Elder”).

However, it turns out that neither of the two Margaritas feel like celebrating today. "La Grande" is still in mourning, since exactly one year ago the sea took the life of Ernesto Lopez, the man she was going to marry. "La Bella" is sad because she has to say goodbye to Mariano Gonzalez, a modest teacher who has won her heart and is now leaving the island to never return. "La Grande" runs to the seashore in an attempt to feel closer to the man she so desperately misses. There, fate gives her the most extraordinary surprise: the swaying of the waves is carrying a man's body toward the shore. "La Grande" dives in and pulls the man out of the sea bringing him to safety. That is how Simon Vargas, who will be known on the island as “the Castaway”, regains consciousness in the arms of a beautiful woman whom he confuses with an angel.

A wonderful yet peculiar relationship develops between them as of that instant. "La Grande" feels that the prophecy of La Maga, her friend and protector, is coming true: “When the sea takes a love, it always gives back a bigger, deeper one”, but who knows if that new love will end up being destined for her sister, "la Bella"? Because inevitably, Margarita "la Bella" also falls under the spell of "the Castaway’s" sensuality, tenderness and joie de vivre. That marks the beginning of a bitter war between the two Margaritas over "the Castaway’s" love - a war that will become legend on Calypso and on many other islands in the Caribbean.

Cast
Chiquinquirá Delgado as Margarita Luisa Volcan - La Grande
Luis Fernandez as Simon Vargas - El Naufrago Perez
Flor Nuñez as Otilia Gades
Alberto Alifa as Ernesto Lopez Larazabal / Eduardo Lopez Larazabal
Karl Hoffman as Jacinto Lara
Felix Loreto as Wenceslao Lugones
Eileen Abad as Yolanda Pujol de Martinez
Juan Manuel Laguardia as Francisco "el caco" Aguirre
Marian Valero as Helena Mendoza
Beatriz Vasquez as Manuela Rojo
Marcos Moreno as Capitan Jacobo Carmona
Zoe Bolivar as Dionisia
Javier Paredes as Cabo Flores
Rolando Padilla as Padre Braulio
Yvan Romero as Plinio
Daniel Garcia as Rafael Manrique
Mirtha Pérez as La Maga
Jose Oliva as Lorenzo Volcan
Johanna Morales as Maria Margarita Volcan - La Bella
Aileen Celeste as Clara Rosa
Giovanni Reali as Pablo Gamboa
Laura Altieri as Laura de Gamboa
Jose Luis Zuleta as Canelon
Ralph Kinnard as Klaus
Aniuska Lopez as Mileydis
Ronny Martinez as Catire
Maria Luisa Lamata as Tia Cecilia

References

External links 
 Calypso at the Internet Movie Database

1999 telenovelas
Venevisión telenovelas
Venezuelan telenovelas
1999 Venezuelan television series debuts
1999 Venezuelan television series endings
Spanish-language telenovelas
Television shows set in Venezuela